The name Erin has been used for six tropical cyclones in the Atlantic Ocean:
 Hurricane Erin (1989), a Category 2 Cape Verde hurricane that stayed away from land.
 Hurricane Erin (1995), a  Category 2 hurricane that made two landfalls in Florida, resulting in 6 direct deaths and $700 million damage.
 Hurricane Erin (2001), a Category 3 major hurricane that passed east of Bermuda.
 Tropical Storm Erin (2007), formed in the Gulf of Mexico and made landfall in Texas.
 Tropical Storm Erin (2013), stayed away from land.
 Tropical Storm Erin (2019), formed off the coast of North Carolina and then moved out to sea; later, after becoming extratropical, produced heavy rain over the Canadian Maritime provinces.

Atlantic hurricane set index articles